Ângelo Gabriel Borges Damaceno (born 21 December 2004),is a Brazilian footballer who plays for Santos as a forward.

Club career

Santos

Born in Brasília, Federal District, Ângelo joined Santos' youth setup in 2015, aged ten.<ref>La Chasse aux Pépites #87 - Ângelo on demivolee.com</ref> In July 2020, aged only 15, he started to appear for the under-20s, being subsequently promoted to the main squad in October by manager Cuca.

On 23 October 2020, Ângelo agreed to a professional pre-contract deal with Peixe'', effective as of his 16th birthday. He made his professional debut two days later, coming on as a second-half substitute for Lucas Braga in a 3–1 away loss against Fluminense for the Série A championship; aged 15 years, 10 months and 4 days, he became the second-youngest ever player to debut for the club, only behind Coutinho, and overcame Pelé by 11 days.

Ângelo made his Copa Libertadores debut on 9 March 2021, starting in a 2–1 home success over Deportivo Lara; aged 16 years, 2 months and 16 days, he became the youngest Santos player to appear in the competition, surpassing Rodrygo.

Ângelo scored his first professional goal on 6 April 2021, netting his team's third in a 3–1 Libertadores away win against San Lorenzo; aged 16 years, 3 months and 16 days, he broke Juan Carlos Cárdenas' record and became the youngest player ever to score in a Libertadores match. On 10 December, after featuring regularly, he renewed his contract until December 2024.

International career
Ângelo represented Brazil under-15s in 2019, scoring in a 4–0 defeat of Uruguay on 27 September and taking part of the 2019 South American U-15 Championship in November.

On 6 March 2020, Ângelo was called up with the under-16s for the year's Montaigu Tournament, but the competition was later suspended due to the COVID-19 pandemic. In October, he was called up to the under-17s for trainings in the following month, but tested positive for COVID-19 during that period.

Career statistics

References

External links

Santos FC profile 

2004 births
Living people
Footballers from Brasília
Brazilian footballers
Association football forwards
Campeonato Brasileiro Série A players
Santos FC players
Brazil youth international footballers